Stellan is a masculine given name used in Sweden. It means “peaceful one” or “calm” and has a German origin. Although many think it is equivalent to Stelio used in Italy, Stelian used in Romania and Stelios in Greece, all serving as masculine versions of the feminine name Stela which means star in Latin language, it is not proven.

People 
Stellan Bengtsson (born 1952), Swedish table tennis player
Stellan Bojerud (1944–2015), Swedish politician
Stellan Brynell (born 1962), Swedish chess player
Stellan Claësson (1886–1970), Swedish film producer
Stellan Fagrell (1943–2022), Swedish officer
Stellan Nilsson (1922–2003), Swedish football player
Stellan Olsson (1936–2022), Swedish film director
Stellan Österberg (born 1965), Swedish badminton player
Stellan Rye (1880–1914), Danish film director
Stellan Skarsgård (born 1951), Swedish actor
Stellan Vinthagen (born 1964), Swedish sociologist
Stellan Westerdahl (1935–2018), Swedish sailor

See also
Stella (given name)

Swedish masculine given names